Lake Käsmu is a lake in Käsmu, Estonia.

See also
List of lakes of Estonia

Kasmu
Haljala Parish
Landforms of Lääne-Viru County